The Holocaust in Greece
Holocaust in Greece